Eren Bilen (born 2 December 2000) is a Turkish footballer who plays as a goalkeeper for Kocaelispor.

Professional career
Bilen made his professional debut with Göztepe in a 3-3 Turkish Cup tie with Antalyaspor on 15 January 2019.

Career statistics

Club

Notes

References

External links
 

2000 births
Footballers from İzmir
Living people
Turkish footballers
Turkey youth international footballers
Association football goalkeepers
Göztepe S.K. footballers
Menemenspor footballers
Kocaelispor footballers
TFF Third League players